Kuroiwa (written:  lit. "black rock") is a Japanese surname. Notable people with the surname include:

, Japanese speed skater
Hisami Kuroiwa, Japanese-American film producer
, Japanese boxer
, Japanese speed skater
, also known as Kuroiwa Ruikō, Japanese journalist and novelist
, Japanese naval aviator
, Japanese speed skater
, Japanese politician
, Japanese film editor
, Japanese bobsledder
, better known as Oniroku Dan, Japanese author

Fictional characters
, a character in the anime series Brave Command Dagwon
, a character in the manga series Tokyo Ghoul
, a character in the manga series Tokyo Ghoul
, a character in the video game Judgment (video game)

Japanese-language surnames